Giulio Toniolatti (born 15 January 1984) is an Italian rugby union footballer who plays as a winger.

A native of Rome, Toniolatti made his debut for Italy in 2008 against Australia and was part of the Italian squad at the 2011 Rugby World Cup.

In May 2013, it was announced that Giulio Toniolatti was moving from Benetton Treviso to Zebre.

References

External links

2011 Rugby World Cup Profile
Giulio Toniolatti news, results, standings, stats, at Itsrugby.co.uk

1984 births
Living people
Sportspeople from Rome
Italian rugby union players
Rugby union wings
Italy international rugby union players
Benetton Rugby players
Zebre Parma players
Aironi players